Ronald J. Rychlak is an American lawyer, jurist, author and political commentator. He is a Distinguished Professor of Law at the University of Mississippi School of Law and is holder of the Jamie L. Whitten Chair in Law and Government. He is known for his published works, career as an attorney, and writings on the role of Pope Pius XII in World War II.

Personal life
Rychlak attended Wabash College and received a Bachelor of Arts degree cum laude in economics in 1980. He then attended Vanderbilt University School of Law, where he was honored with the Order of the Coif and received his Juris Doctor (J.D.) in 1983. Rychlak is married, has six children, and resides in Oxford, Mississippi.

Career
Rychlak is a Distinguished Professor of Law at the University of Mississippi. He has been at the university since 1987, holds the Jamie L. Whitten Chair in Law and Government, and is the former Associate Dean for Academic Affairs. Before becoming a professor, he was an attorney with Jenner & Block in Chicago. He is a member of the Illinois Bar. Rychlak also clerked for Judge Harry W. Wellford of the United States Sixth Circuit Court of Appeals.

Professor Rychlak serves as the University of Mississippi's Faculty Athletics Representative (2007—), Chair of the Intercollegiate Athletics Committee (2007—), and is a member of the University Athletics Diversity Committee (2016—). He served as the Chair of Institutional Compliance Committee (2007-2016). In addition, Professor Rychlak is a member of the executive committee of the Southeastern Conference (2014—; Secretary 2017—).

His memberships include the Phi Kappa Phi Honor Society, the National Association of Scholars, the editorial boards of The Gaming Law Review and Economics and Cluny Media, the Society of Catholic Social Scientists (Board of Directors 2009—), the Fellowship of Catholic Scholars, the Catholic Association of Scientists and Engineers (2010—), the International Masters of Gaming Law, the Catholic League for Religious and Civil Rights (Board of Advisors, 2007—), and the International Brotherhood of Magicians.

Rychlak is on the board of directors of the Southeastern Association of Law Schools (President, 2018-2019). He serves on the board of governors of Ave Maria School of Law (2011—).

He was appointed by the Mississippi Supreme Court to be a member of the committee working on a revision of Mississippi's criminal code. He is a member of the Mississippi Advisory Committee to the U.S. Civil Rights Commission.

Rychlak serves as an advisor to the Holy See's Permanent Observer Mission to the United Nations on various issues of international law.

He is the author or co-author of twelve books.  His book Hitler, the War, and the Pope addresses and refutes the claim that Pope Pius XII failed to stand up for the victims of Nazi aggression in World War II. His book, Disinformation, is co-authored with Ion Mihai Pacepa, the highest ranking Soviet bloc intelligence agent to ever defect to the U.S.

He has also published numerous articles on social, religious, and legal subjects including criminal law, trial practice, free speech, international law, gaming law, and environmental law. He has been published in the  Notre Dame Law Review, UCLA Law Review, Boston College Law Review, and Stanford Environmental Law Journal, among others.

He has been a panelist for The Washington Post's "On Faith" blog, a columnist for Crisis magazine online, and is a regular contributor to The Epoch Times (2018—).

Works
 Hitler, the War, and the Pope, Our Sunday Visitor; Rev Exp edition (May 28, 2010).
.
 Righteous Gentiles: How Pope Pius XII Saved Half a Million Jews from the Nazis, (Spence Publishing, 2005).
 Clerical Sexual Misconduct: An Interdisciplinary Analysis, (2020); co-editor and contributor.
 The Persecution and Genocide of Christians in the Middle East; Prevention, Prohibition, & Prosecution, Angelico Press (2017); co-editor and contributor.
 Looming Disaster: Top Disinformation Expert Reveals What's at Stake for the United States in the 2016 Election, with Ion Mihai Pacepa, WND Books (2016 eBook).
 American Law From a Catholic Perspective: Through a Clearer Lens, Rowman and Littlefield (2015; paperback 2016); editor and contributor.
 Real and Demonstrative Evidence: A Real-World Practice Manual for Winning at Trial, third edition, Juris Publishing, Inc. (2012).
 Environmental Law: Thompson Reuters Law for the Layperson with David Case. West/Thompson Reuters (2011).
 Trial by Fury: Restoring the Common Good in Tort Litigation, monograph 8 in the Christian Social Thought Series, The Acton Institute (2005).
 Mississippi Criminal Trial Practice, with Marc Harrold, Thompson/West (2004).
 Gaming Law: Cases and Materials, with Robert M. Jarvis, et al., Matthew Bender & Co. (2003).

Awards and honors
 2019 Distinguished Research and Creative Achievement Award University of Mississippi.
 2017 Ben Hardy Faculty Excellence Award University of Mississippi School of Law.
 2013 Pius XI Award for Social Scholarship, Society of Catholic Social Scientists.
 2012 Distinguished Service Award, Southeastern Association of Law Schools.
 2012 Lifetime Contribution to Amateur Football by the University of Mississippi Chapter of the National Football Foundation and Hall of Fame.
 2008 Blessed Cardinal Stepinac medal Roman Catholic Archdiocese of Zagreb for his historical work.
 2007: Honoree, U.S. Holocaust Museum for his work with on inter-faith dialogue.
 2006: Blessed Frederic Ozanam Award for Social Action, Society of Catholic Social Scientists.
 Medals for diplomatic service to the Holy See from Pope John Paul II and Pope Benedict XVI.

References

External links
Goldhagen vs. Pius XII Catholic Education Resource Center
The Priests of Dachau CatholiCity
Historical Dishonesty: The Big Lie of John Cornwell’s Book Hitler’s Pope Catholic Answers
Cardinal Stepinac, Pope Pius XII, and the Roman Catholic Church During the Second World War The Catholic Social Science Review
Will the Government Tell Christians to Shut Up? Catholic Answers
"NOTHING IS EVER ANYBODY’S FAULT" Do We Choose to Act or Are We Merely Conditioned? Catholic Answers
Should Catholics Be Environmentalists? Catholic Answers
Why I Don't Hold Hands at Mass Catholic Answers
Fr. Christian and the Paris Underground Voices - Women for Faith and Family
Understanding Visual Exhibits in the Global Warming Debate The Heartland Institute
List of publications by Rychlak
"Pope Pius XII and the Holocaust" - a debate with Susan Zuccotti 

American lawyers
American legal writers
History of the papacy
Historians of the Catholic Church
American Roman Catholics
Historians of the Holocaust
University of Mississippi faculty
Vanderbilt University alumni
Wabash College alumni
Living people
National Association of Scholars
American people of Ukrainian descent
American people of Polish descent
Place of birth missing (living people)
1957 births
People associated with Jenner & Block